Lac de Capitellu is a lake in Haute-Corse, France. At an elevation of 1930 m, its surface area is 0.055 km2.

It is close to Lac de Melu, in the commune of Corte.

References 

Lakes of Haute-Corse
Capitellu